Isaac Joseph Gracie-Burrow (born 28 October 1994), known professionally as simply Isaac Gracie, is a British singer-songwriter from Ealing, West London. As a child, Gracie sang in the Ealing Abbey Choir and started writing songs at the age of 14. Gracie signed a record deal with Virgin EMI Records in 2016 and released his self titled debut album in 2018. Gracie has been compared with the likes of Jeff Buckley, Nick Drake, and Bob Dylan, amongst others.

Discography

Studio albums 
 Isaac Gracie (2018), peaked at No. 36 on the UK Albums Chart.

Live albums 
 Songs in Black and White (2016)

Extended plays 
 Songs From My Bedroom (2016)
 close up - looking down (2018)

Singles 
 "The Death of You & I" (2017) 
 "Terrified" (2017)
 "Last Words" (2018)
 "Running on Empty" (2018)
 "Show me Love" (2018)
 "The man who flew into space" (2023)

Videos 
 Reverie (2017)
 All in my Mind (2017)
 The Death of You & I (2017) 
 Silhouettes of You (2017)
 Terrified (2017)
 Last Words (2018)
 Running on Empty (2018)
 Show me Love (2018)
 The man who flew into space (2023)

References

External links 
 
 Official charts for Isaac Gracie

1994 births
Living people
British male singer-songwriters
British folk rock musicians
British indie rock musicians
People from Ealing
Dew Process artists
Virgin Records artists